is a railway station in the city of Ueda, Nagano, Japan, operated by the private railway operating company Ueda Electric Railway.

Lines
Shiroshita Station is served by the Bessho Line and is 0.8 kilometers from the terminus of the line at Ueda Statuion.

Station layout
The station consists of two ground-level opposed side platforms. The platforms are not numbered. The station is unattended.

Platforms

History
It was renamed Shiroshita Station in December 1927.

Station numbering was introduced in August 2016 with Shiroshita being assigned station number BE02.

Passenger statistics
In fiscal 2015, the station was used by an average of 18 passengers daily (boarding passengers only).

Surrounding area
Miyoshichō Post Office
Shiroshita Elementary School
Chikuma River

See also
 List of railway stations in Japan

References

External links

 

Railway stations in Japan opened in 1921
Railway stations in Nagano Prefecture
Ueda Electric Railway
Ueda, Nagano